Esmethadone (developmental code name REL-1017), also known as dextromethadone, is the (S)-enantiomer of methadone. It acts as an N-methyl-D-aspartate receptor (NMDAR) antagonist, among other actions. Unlike levomethadone, it has low affinity for opioid receptors and lacks significant respiratory depressant action and abuse liability. Esmethadone is under development for the treatment of major depressive disorder. As of August 2022, it is in phase 3 clinical trials for this indication.

There is an asymmetric synthesis available to prepare both esmethadone (S-(+)-methadone) and levomethadone (R-(−)-methadone).

References

Experimental drugs
NMDA receptor antagonists
Opioids